This list of Numéro Korea cover models  is a catalog of cover models who appeared on the cover of the Korean edition of Numéro magazine, published between August 2008 and February 2010.

2008

2009

2010

References

External links
 Numéro Korea on the Fashion Model Directory

Korea